STAN Polytechnic of State Finance (abbreviated as PKN STAN), is a government-affiliated college in Indonesia, located in Banten, in Bintaro Sector V Tangerang Selatan. It offers undergraduate degrees in finance. The curriculum is focused on public finance, with an emphasis on government policy and regulation. Upon completion of their study, PKN STAN graduates serve in government institutions in Indonesia especially in the Ministry of Finance of the Republic of Indonesia (Directorate General of Taxes, Directorate of Customs and Excise, etc.). PKN STAN director is Mr. Rahmadi Murwanto.

Government affiliation

PKN STAN is a government-affiliated college which means that the college is administered and funded by the government of Indonesia through the institution it is affiliated to. The government institution affiliated to PKN STAN is the Ministry of Finance of the Republic of Indonesia. This affiliation with the government results in cost of education not being charged to the students of the college. In return, the graduates of the college are obliged to serve in government institutions in Indonesia. The Ministry of Finance of the Republic of Indonesia gets the largest number of graduates every year. The other government institutions get a portion of the college graduates allocation are the Government Accountability Office of the Republic of Indonesia (Badan Pemeriksa Keuangan Republik Indonesia/ BPK RI)and the Financial and Development Supervisory Agency (Badan Pengawasan Keuangan dan Pembangunan / BPKP). In previous years, there is a record of allocation of graduates to the Ministry of State-Owned Enterprise of Indonesia.

Academic programs
PKN STAN offers Diploma I Program, Diploma III Program, and Diploma IV Program. These programs are tailored to create professionals in public sector (government). Therefore, the courses in the college are a combination of economics, law, and public administration. Every year, the students in PKN STAN are evaluated. They have to achieve a minimum grade point average (GPA) of 2.75 out of 4.0.

Diploma I Program
Diploma I Program is a one-year program intended to create professionals with basic skills needed in the government sector. The program consists of 50 credits with three areas of specialization:
 Customs and Excise
 Taxation
 Treasury

Diploma III Program
Diploma III Program is a three-year program intended to create professionals with skills needed in the government sector. The program consists of 120 credits with six areas of specialization:
 Accounting
 Taxation
 Property Appraisal 
 Receivable and Auction Administration
 Customs and Excise
 Treasury

Since the students serve in government institutions upon completion of their study, the courses taught in the program have emphasis on the public sector, especially the government sector. The curriculum also includes accounting in the private sector to enrich the knowledge of the students. Upon graduation, the students receive Ahli Madya (A.Md), a professional degree in Indonesia.

For the D-I program, students can continue to the D-III program after working for two years in the government institutions (Ministry of Finance); students graduated from D-I program can only major to D-III program for specialization in accounting.

Diploma IV Program in Accounting
Diploma IV Program in Accounting is a two-year program that can only be taken after students finish the D-III program. The program has one area of specialization in accounting. Prospective students graduated from D-III program with specialization other than accounting conduct an additional semester of matriculation courses. The majority of the students admitted in the D-IV program have professional work experience in government institutions. Upon graduation, the students receive Bachelor of Science's degree in accounting.

But, in 2021 PKN STAN also opened a Diploma IV Program for high school graduates so they don't have to study Diploma III program first. They also must go through a character building program which obliged them to live in dorms provided by PKN STAN in their first year of D-IV study.

Admissions
Admission to PKN STAN's D-III program is open to high school graduates. The general requirement is that applicants have graduated from high school no more than three years before the admission year. The applicants have to pass the intake examination. Admission to the D-III program is extremely competitive. On average every year, the college receives no less than 85,000 applications and accepts only around 1,300 to 1,500 students (1.5%–1.8%). This means at least 57 people fought for each place, which is one of the highest ratios of any higher education institution in Indonesia. In 2007 admission year, 125.000 high school graduates competed for 2.014 available seat. Due to the selectivity of the school, most PKN STAN students arrive at the school with significantly higher grades.

Admission to STAN's D-IV program can only be done by students who have completed the D-III program and must complete a period of service in government institutions. They also have to pass the intake examination.

Student life
The college doesn't provide campus dormitories There are various character development activities that the students are obligated to participate into.

External links
http://www.kemenkeu.go.id/
http://www.bppk.kemenkeu.go.id/index.php/id/
http://www.pknstan.ac.id/
http://www.pajak.go.id/
http://www.beacukai.go.id/
http://www.bpkp.go.id/
http://www.bpk.go.id/

Colleges in Indonesia
Buildings and structures in Banten
Education in Banten
Educational institutions established in 1964
1964 establishments in Indonesia